Pawnee County Courthouse may refer to:

Pawnee County Courthouse (Nebraska), Pawnee City, Nebraska
Pawnee County Courthouse (Oklahoma), Pawnee, Oklahoma